Bebearia laetitioides is a butterfly in the family Nymphalidae. It is found in the eastern part of the Democratic Republic of the Congo and western Uganda. The habitat consists of forests.

References

Butterflies described in 1921
laetitioides